ECH may refer to:

 Echuca Airport, in Victoria, Australia
 Embedded contact homology
 Emergency Command Hologram, a character in the television series Star Trek: Voyager
 Enhanced Combat Helmet (disambiguation)
 Epichlorohydrin
 Enterprise Cultural Heritage
 Encrypted Client Hello